Patrick Kong (born 22 September 1975) is a Hong Kong film director and screenwriter.

Filmography
As director

As screenwriter
2003: Men Suddenly in Black

Television series 
2019: Stained (FOX TV)
2022: The Beauty of War (TVB)

References

External links

1975 births
Hong Kong film directors
Hong Kong screenwriters
Living people
Alumni of Hong Kong Baptist University